Emba Hunutlu power station is a 1320 MW coal fired power station in Turkey in Adana Province.  it is the largest Chinese foreign direct investment in the country. Despite opposition from many environmental organisations the plant was started up in 2022 and burns Russian coal as it is cheaper than other coal. The plant is less than 2 km from another coal-fired power station, İsken Sugözü.

History
The project was proposed in 2012. In 2015 it was licensed, despite environmental protests, and Shanghai Electric Power said it would be China's largest ever direct investment in Turkey.  

In April 2019 a Belt and Road Initiative deal was signed to build the 1320 MW power station and construction started in September. It is also part of Turkey's Middle Corridor.

In June 2022 opposition Republican People's Party Adana deputy Burhanettin Bulut called for a Parliamentary inquiry, complaining that the power plant was about to be started up despite ongoing lawsuits and a one hundred thousand signature petition.

Unit 1 started up in July 2022 and the other unit in October.

Ownership
The project is a joint venture between Shanghai Electric Power (a subsidiary of China's State Power Investment Corporation), Avic-Intl Project Engineering Company (3%), and two Turkish local investors, Mete Bülgün, CEO of the joint venture and Adnan Demir (9.4% each) with Shanghai Electric Power holding 78%.

Finance and economics
The finance is 20% capital  and the rest a 15-year $1.381 billion loan from China Development Bank, Bank of China and Industrial and Commercial Bank of China. 

In 2021 Turkey targeted net zero carbon emissions by 2053. According to Banktrack the project is struggling with finance.

Subsidies
By 2020, according to Carbon Tracker, both new wind and solar power were cheaper than building new coal power plants; and they forecast that wind would become cheaper than existing coal plants in 2027, and solar in 2023: so they say that constructing  the plant is a waste of money.
However the company benefited from value-added tax exemptions of almost 3.5 billion lira in 2016.  WWF say it will make a loss.

Construction
Test piles have been constructed and in April 2019 Shanghai Electric Power said that "the successful signing of the facility agreement indicates that the project construction will enter into a fast-growth period". However construction of the coal silos was delayed.

Employment
The company says it will employ 4000 people in construction and 500 in operation.

Design and specification
The thermal power station would have  2x660 MW Ultra Super critical units with steam pressure of 27 MPa and reheat steam temperature of 600°C.

Coal supply

Imported coal is stored in 3 large sea side silos, and the plant can also run on local coal.

Electricity generation

Efficiency
The design is for gross efficiency up to 46% with a gross coal consumption rate less than 270 g/kWh (7000 kcal/kg LHV standard coal).

Cooling system
The plant would be cooled by water from Iskenderun Bay.

Waste products

Local air pollution control

Nitrogen Oxides
The selective catalytic reduction is designed to be more than 70% efficient, and according to the company will reduce NOx emissions to less than 100mg/Nm3.

Sulfur Dioxide and Dust
The design is for a combination of electrostatic precipitators, flue-gas desulfurization and wet scrubbers to reduce dust emissions to less than 5mg/Nm3.

Mercury

Mercury was not mentioned in the Environmental Impact Assessment but has been estimated at 175.5 kg/year.

Health and safety
A public meeting was due to be held in January 2022 to discuss the environmental impact report for Emba Hunutlu, with the owners now adding 43 MW of wind and 37 MW of solar (the electricity for use on site), to the 1320 MW of coal power which had been due to open in 2021. The company say that they devote themselves  to building a power plant with "no pollution". But environmental groups estimate that air pollution from the power station would cause an extra 50 early deaths per year. Another estimate is that closing the plant by 2030, instead of when its licence ends in 2064, would prevent over 5000 premature deaths.

The company has published safety guidelines.

Environmental effects
An expert report in 2020 concluded that the plant would be contrary to the İskenderun Bay (Adana-Mersin-Hatay) Integrated Coastal Areas Plan's principles, and opponents say it contravenes the Biodiversity Convention.

Water
According to WWF-Turkey the project threatens the loggerhead sea turtles and green sea turtles which nest on nearby Sugözü Beach. Quoting the project environmental impact assessment as saying that the outgoing cooling water will be 7°C higher than the sea water, they say temperatures could exceed 35°C in summer and be fatal to the turtles. Coal shipments and delivery might also disturb the turtles.

Dust
 Turkey has no legal limit on fine particulate (PM2.5) emissions. The Health and Environment Alliance say that TurkStat figures show respiratory diseases have already increased in Adana Province, and that could be due to other coal-fired power stations.

Greenhouse gases
Shanghai Electric Power Company says it is "sustainable power generation" but the power station will increase Turkey's greenhouse gas emissions: if operational according to its design capacity factor and lifetime it will emit over 200 million tonnes of carbon dioxide.

Opposition
TEMA Foundation filed a lawsuit in 2017 and in 2018 several other organisations under the grouping of Doğu Akdeniz Çevre Platformu (East Mediterranean Environment Platform) were in ongoing legal action in Ankara.

See also

Energy policy of Turkey
List of power stations in Turkey
Electricity sector in Turkey

References

External links
 Emba Hunutlu power station on Global Energy Monitor
 Banktrack and updates
  Plan additions and revisions (Turkish)

Coal-fired power stations in Turkey
Buildings and structures in Adana
Protests in Turkey
Environmentalism in Turkey
Belt and Road Initiative